Lonesome Lenny is a 1946 Screwy Squirrel cartoon directed by Tex Avery and released to theaters on March 9, 1946 by Metro-Goldwyn-Mayer. It is the last Screwy Squirrel cartoon; he is "killed" off on-screen at the end of the short.

Plot
Screwy Squirrel becomes the playmate of a lonesome, dopey, and strong dog Lenny, in a broad parody of John Steinbeck's "Of Mice and Men".

Voice cast
Wally Maher as Screwy Squirrel and Pet Store Owner (uncredited)
Tex Avery as Lenny the Dog (uncredited) 
Sara Berner as Lady (uncredited)

Home media
DVD
The Katharine Hepburn Collection
Blu-ray
Tex Avery Screwball Classics Volume 1

References

External links

1946 animated films
1946 short films
1946 films
Metro-Goldwyn-Mayer animated short films
1940s American animated films
1940s animated short films
Animated films about squirrels
Animated films about dogs
Films directed by Tex Avery
Films scored by Scott Bradley
Films with screenplays by Henry Wilson Allen
Films produced by Fred Quimby
Metro-Goldwyn-Mayer cartoon studio short films